Four Dimensions may refer to:

Four Dimensions (Don Patterson album), 1968
Four Dimensions (Lollipop F album), 2010

See also
Four Dimensions of Greta
Fourth dimension (disambiguation)
Four dimensional
4D (disambiguation)